Santa Maria del Sasso, also known as the Sanctuary of Santa Maria del Sasso is a Renaissance church near Bibbiena in Tuscany, Italy.

The first church on the site was constructed in 1347 following a reported appearance of the Virgin Mary on 23 June 1347. The current building was commissioned by Lorenzo de' Medici and constructed by Giuliano da Maiano starting in 1486. Following a visit by Savonarola in 1495 the work was expanded to include a convent and sanctuary. It was given the status of minor basilica in 1942.

In the centre of the church there is a tempietto or free-standing chapel containing a fresco of the Madonna and child by Bicci di Lorenzo. There is an altarpiece of Christ and John the Baptist in polychrome terracotta by Giovanni della Robbia, and another Madonna and child by Fra Paolo da Pistoia.

References 

Churches in the province of Arezzo
15th-century Roman Catholic church buildings in Italy
Renaissance architecture in Tuscany
Roman Catholic churches completed in 1487
Bibbieno